These are the official results of the Men's Decathlon competition at the 1993 World Championships in Stuttgart, Germany. There were a total number of 25 participating athletes, including three non-finishers. The competition started on Thursday August 19, 1993, and ended on Friday August 20, 1993. The gold medal was won by Dan O'Brien of the United States with a score of 8891 points.

Medalists

Schedule

August 19

August 20

Records

Final standings

See also
 1992 Men's Olympic Decathlon
 1993 Hypo-Meeting
 1993 Decathlon Year Ranking
 1994 Men's European Championships Decathlon

Notes

References
 Results

D
Decathlon at the World Athletics Championships